Muhammad Al-Badr (15 February 1926 – 6 August 1996) was the last king and Zaidi Imam of the Mutawakkilite Kingdom of Yemen (North Yemen) and leader of the monarchist regions during the North Yemen Civil War (1962–1970). His full name was Al-Mansur Bi'llah Muhammad Al-Badr bin Al-Nasir-li-dinu'llah Ahmad, Imam and Commander of the Faithful and King of the Mutawakkilite Kingdom of the Yemen.

Biography 
Al-Badr was born in 1926 as oldest son of Ahmad bin Yahya, later imam of the Zaydis and king of North Yemen. In 1944 he moved to Taizz in the south of the country, where his father had already been the Imam's deputy for several years, to continue his education. Soon after the assassination of Imam Yahya in February 1948 plotted by Sayyid Abdullah al-Wazir, al-Badr arrived in Sana'a, the capital, but apparently only gave tacit support to the new regime. Meanwhile, Sayf al-Islam Ahmad had managed to get away from Taizz and made for Hajjah, where he gathered the tribes around him, proclaimed himself Imam with the title of al-Nasir and within a month of the assassination had easily regained control of Sana'a and executed the principal perpetrators of the rebellion.

Sayf al-Islam al-Badr (as Muhammad now became), not yet 20, was clearly able to patch up speedily any misunderstandings with his father, for in late 1949 he was appointed his deputy over Hodeida, the important port on the Red Sea. He was also made Minister of the Interior.

Al-Badr played a prominent role in quelling the revolt against his father, Imam Ahmad, in 1955 led by Ahmad's brother Sayf al-Islam Abdullah and afterwards was declared Crown Prince.

In that same year Ahmad bin Yahya forged connections and signed agreements during a tour to Soviet bloc countries. In April 1956 he signed a mutual defence pact with Egypt, involving a unified military command, and in 1958 incorporated Yemen with the United Arab Republic of Egypt and Syria into what then became the United Arab States.

During the remaining period of Imam Ahmad's rule, Sayf al-Islam al-Badr held the post of Minister of Foreign Affairs and from 1958 he was also the Imam's deputy over Sana'a.

Like most young Arab leaders of his generation, Al-Badr had been a great admirer of the Egyptian President Gamal Abdel Nasser. So in 1959 while he was in charge of Yemen for a few months during Imam Ahmad's absence in Italy for medical treatment, he arranged for Egyptian experts to come and help modernize Yemen in all fields, including the military. His father annulled these upon his return.

An assassination attempt on the life of Imam Ahmad in March 1961 left the latter gravely crippled, so in October Sayf al-Islam al-Badr took over effective control of the government. On 19 September 1962 Ahmad died in his sleep, al-Badr was proclaimed Imam and King and took the title of al-Mansur.

A week later rebels shelled his residence, Dar al-Bashair, in the Bir al-Azab district of Sana'a whence on September 26, 1962, Abdullah as-Sallal, whom al-Badr had appointed commander of the royal guard, staged a coup, and declared himself president of the Yemen Arab Republic.

Al-Badr escaped to the north of North Yemen, and rallied tribes that support him in opposition to Sallal. Fighting erupted between the two groups, starting the North Yemen Civil War. Al-Badr started getting support from Saudi Arabia, while the republicans received support from Egypt.

Although the revolution had announced to the world that al-Badr had died beneath the rubble of his palace, he had in fact managed to escape unhurt and set out to the north. As he proceeded on his journey the tribes rallied round him pledging him their unconditional allegiance as Amir al-Mumineen ("Leader of the believers"). These tribes were Zaydi Shia for whom unstinted loyalty to an imam from the Ahl al-Bayt (the descendants of the Prophet) was a fundamental obligation of their religion. A few days later he held a press conference over the border in south-west Saudi Arabia. His uncle Sayf al-Islam al-Hasan, who had been abroad and had been proclaimed Imam at the news of al-Badr's alleged demise, immediately gave allegiance to him together with all the princes of the Hamid al-Din family. Soon the entire tribal confederation of Bakil along with most of Hashid who occupied the central and northern highlands of Yemen and who had been Zaydis for centuries joined enthusiastically the cause of the Imam and the princes to fight the revolutionary regime.

During the bloody civil war which continued for eight years al-Badr, like his cousins, played a vital role. He lived alongside his men the life of a warrior, sharing with them every deprivation and hardship. He set up his headquarters in various places in the scenically spectacular mountainous north-west Yemen, on Jebal Qara, for instance, in the region of Hajur al-Sham and at al-Muhabisha high up above the Tihama plain. These HQs situated in caves fitted out with every basic facility deep in the mountainside were nevertheless constantly under the threat of Egyptian bombardment from the air. In 1967 al-Badr left his HQ at Mabyan near Hajjah for Taif in Saudi Arabia, where he stayed until the end of the war.

In 1970, despite the fact that territorially most of the Yemen remained under the control of al-Badr and the Hamid al-Din family, Saudi Arabia, which had been the principal opponent of the Sana'a regime, recognized the Yemen Arab Republic and other nations like the United Kingdom swiftly followed suit.

Stunned by Saudi Arabia's recognition of the republican regime which had been negotiated without any consultation with him whatsoever, al-Badr refused to stay any longer in Saudi Arabia and demanded that he be permitted to leave the kingdom immediately. He went to England, where he lived quietly in a modest house in Kent, only going abroad to visit the holy cities of Mecca and Medina and to call on relatives and friends in that part of the world.

He died in 1996 in London, and is buried in Brookwood Cemetery in Woking, in Surrey.

Honours 
 Knight Grand Cross of the Order of Merit of the Italian Republic (28 November 1957).

See also
North Yemen Civil War
Bruce Conde

Notes

References 

1926 births
1996 deaths
Burials at Brookwood Cemetery
Zaydi imams of Yemen
Heads of state of North Yemen
Middle Eastern royalty
Pretenders
Knights Grand Cross of the Order of Merit of the Italian Republic
20th-century rulers in Asia
Monarchs of Yemen
Hamidaddin family